Fort Kent is a hamlet in central Alberta, Canada within the Municipal District of Bonnyville No. 87, located on Highway 28 approximately  southwest of Cold Lake.

Demographics 

See also 
List of communities in Alberta
List of designated places in Alberta
List of hamlets in Alberta

References 

Municipal District of Bonnyville No. 87
Hamlets in Alberta
Designated places in Alberta